The Village Teacher is a 1947 Soviet drama film directed by Mark Donskoy.

Plot 
The film tells the story of a teacher young Varya, who is going to teach peasant children in one village, which treats her coolly upon her arrival. Suddenly an acquaintance and former lover of Varya, a bolshevik   Martynov, arrives in town marries and Varys. The revolution begins.

Cast 
 Vera Maretskaya as Varvara  Vasilievna Martynova
 Pavel Olenev as Igor Petrovich, school custodian
 Daniil Sagal as Sergei   Martinov
 Vladimir Lepeshinsky as   Voronov  
 Vladimir Maruta as Voronov, a gold miner
 Vladimir Belokurov as Bukov, a gold miner
 Anatoli Gonichev as Yefim Tsigankov, as a boy / Sergei Tsigankov, his son 
 Emma Balashova as Dunya 
 Roza Makagonova as Mashenka
 Aleksey Konsovsky as  Kolya Sharygin
 Mikhail Gluzsky as soldier
 Rostislav Plyatt as secondary school headmaster
 Fyodor Odinokov as Bukov's guest

See also
 The Village Doctor

References

External links 
 

1947 films
1940s Russian-language films
1947 drama films
Soviet drama films
Soviet black-and-white films
Gorky Film Studio films
Films directed by Mark Donskoy